Christopher Gómez (born 15 March 1989) is an Australian football player who currently plays for Persepam Madura United in Indonesia Super League. He is a left foot player who can play both as striker, behind the striker or attacking midfield and can also play from the left wing.

References

External links
Christopher Gómez at Liga Indonesia

1989 births
Living people
Australian soccer players
Australian expatriate soccer players
Australian expatriate sportspeople in Indonesia
Expatriate footballers in Indonesia
Liga 1 (Indonesia) players
Australian people of Spanish descent
Association football forwards
Marconi Stallions FC players
Macarthur Rams FC players
Persepam Madura Utama players
St George FC players
Bankstown City FC players